Carla Angeline Reyes Abellana (born June 12, 1986) is a Filipino actress and model who played the lead role in the Philippine adaptation of the Mexican telenovela Rosalinda in 2009. She is also known  for her lead role in Sine Novela: Basahang Ginto in 2010, Kung Aagawin Mo Ang Langit in 2011, Makapiling Kang Muli in 2012, My Husband's Lover in 2013, My Destiny in 2014, Because of You in 2015, Mulawin vs. Ravena and I Heart Davao in 2017. Her first anti-heroine role in Pamilya Roces in 2018, and her family-oriented drama Love of My Life in 2020.

Biography
Carla Angeline Reyes Abellana was born on June 12, 1986, in Manila, Philippines. Abellana is the daughter of actor Rey "PJ" Abellana and Rea Reyes. Her maternal grandmother is veteran actress, Delia Razon. She graduated cum laude from De La Salle University with a Bachelor of Arts degree in psychology..She is of German and Spanish descent.

Career
Abellana began her career modeling for different TV commercials, including CreamSilk Leave-on in 2002, Palmolive Conditioner in 2005. In 2009, she auditioned for Zorro, but GMA Network instead cast her in a lead role in Rosalinda, a remake of the Mexican telenovela of the same name. She subsequently became a model for Bench, also in 2009. In 2011, Nigel Barker photographed her for a photo shoot in the Philippine Tatler. She also appeared in the Philippine Fashion Week 2011, where she modeled clothes by Michele Sison.  She has co-hosted SOP Rules, StarStruck, Party Pilipinas, the cooking show Del Monte Kitchenomics, and Karelasyon, a drama anthology series. She has also hosted the pageants Binibining Pilipinas 2010 and Miss World Philippines 2013. In 2013, she joined Sunday All Stars as a judge.

Abellana is a contract star of Regal Films.  She signed a 12-picture contract with the company. Her first film under Regal Films is Mamarazzi. Abellana appeared in her first horror film which was an entry to 2010 Metro Manila Film Festival, Shake, Rattle & Roll XII. In September 2011, Abellana starred in the Regal Films film My Neighbor's Wife. By the end of 2011, Abellana also appeared in two films, both of which are entries for the 2011 Metro Manila Film Festival: Yesterday, Today, Tomorrow and 2011's Manila Kingpin: The Asiong Salonga Story. 2014 she started in the Ensemble Romantic Comedy by Jose Javier Reyes Somebody to Love her alongside Matteo Guidicelli and So It's You with Jc De Vera and Tom Rodriguez. In 2015, she starred again with Tom Rodriguez in the film No Boyfriend Since Birth, her second film with Reyes.

Filmography

Television

Series

Anthologies

Sitcoms

Hosting

Modeling

Movies

Awards and nominations

References

External links

 
 
 
 Carla Abellana at iGMA.tv

1986 births
Living people
Actresses from Manila
De La Salle University alumni
Filipino female models
Filipino film actresses
Filipino people of American descent
Filipino people of German descent
Filipino people of Spanish descent
Filipino people of Chinese descent
Filipino television actresses
GMA Network personalities
People from Santa Mesa
Visayan people
21st-century Filipino actresses